Ricardo Felipe da Silva (born 31 March 1999) is a Brazilian footballer who currently plays as a midfielder for Decisão.

Career statistics

Club

Notes

References

1999 births
Living people
Brazilian footballers
Association football midfielders
Clube Atlético do Porto players
Sociedade Esportiva Decisão Futebol Clube players